Cardonnel Halt railway station served the village of Skewen, in the historical county of Glamorganshire, Wales, from 1905 to 1936 on the Swansea and Neath Railway.

History 
The station was opened on 1 June 1905 by the Great Western Railway. It closed on 28 September 1936.

References 

Disused railway stations in Neath Port Talbot
Former Great Western Railway stations
Railway stations in Great Britain opened in 1905
Railway stations in Great Britain closed in 1936
1905 establishments in Wales
1936 disestablishments in Wales